The Tomb Complex of Nereshánbo is a 1984 science fantasy tabletop role-playing game introductory Swords & Glory adventure set in the world of Tékumel, published by Tékumel Games.

Contents
The Tomb Complex of Nereshánbo is an adventure in which the player characters discover the tomb complex of Nereshánbo hiVridame, a Mriyan of great power during the Second Imperium of Tsolyanu who died under mysterious circumstances.

History
Initially published in 1984 by Tékumel Games, it was republished in 1997 by Tita's House of Games.

Reception
Frederick Paul Kiesche III reviewed The Tomb Complex of Nereshánbo in Space Gamer No. 71. Kiesche commented that "Tomb Complex overall is a good starting adventure for EPT/S&G."

References

Fantasy role-playing game adventures
Role-playing game supplements introduced in 1984
Tékumel